Mamadou 'Madinho' Dansoko (born July 31, 1982 in Abidjan) is an Ivorian former professional footballer who last played as a winger for United Arab Emirates club Al-Hissan.

Career 
He began his career at ASEC Abidjan, a club based in Ivory Coast which is famed for its Youth Academy started by Jean-Marc Guillou, playing alongside the likes of Kolo Touré, before moving to Europe to play for K.S.K. Beveren in the Belgian Jupiler League. In 2003, he went on to join French Ligue 1 outfit FC Lorient, staying there until summer of 2007 when he moved to Al-Hissan in the Middle East.

In 2000 as an 18-year-old he reportedly had trials with English club Arsenal along with Ivorian international Gilles Yapi Yapo.

In the African Champions' Cup 2002 he was joint 3rd top scorer with five goals for ASEC, alongside fellow Ivorian Bakari Koné, who later joined him at FC Lorient before moving on to Ligue 1 club OGC Nice.

References

External links 
 Profile on FC Lorient Official Site
 
 Profile on foot-national.com

1982 births
Living people
Ivorian footballers
AS Cherbourg Football players
FC Lorient players
Footballers from Abidjan
Association football wingers

fr:Mamadou Dansoko
no:Mamadou Dansoko
zh:巴卡里·科内